Henrik Edland (24 April 1905 – 5 June 1984) was a Norwegian veterinarian known for his work on improving the production of beef and on the conservation of puffins.

He was born in Gjesdal. He was professor of anatomy at the Norwegian School of Veterinary Science from 1936 to 1973, and served as rector there from 1951 to 1957. He died in Nittedal.

References

1905 births
1984 deaths
People from Gjesdal
Norwegian veterinarians
Academic staff of the Norwegian School of Veterinary Science
Rectors of the Norwegian School of Veterinary Science